Pabstiella alligatorifera is a species of orchid plant native to Brazil.

References 

alligatorifera
Flora of Brazil
Plants described in 1865